Zmiyivka, is a village in Beryslav Raion, within Kherson Oblast, Ukraine. It belongs to Beryslav urban hromada, one of the hromadas of Ukraine.

Zmiyivka is known for its Old Swede community which was established there in the 18th century after they were deported from Dagö Island following the Russian annexation of Estonia.

References

Villages in Beryslav Raion
Populated places on the Dnieper in Ukraine